Estádio Olímpico Milton de Souza Corrêa, commonly known as Zerão , is a multi-purpose stadium located in Macapá, Brazil. It is used mostly for football matches and hosts the home matches of Esporte Clube Macapá, Oratório Recreativo Clube, Trem Desportivo Clube, Santos Futebol Clube (AP) and São Paulo Futebol Clube (AP). The stadium has a maximum capacity of 13,680 people and was built in 1990. The name (and the fame) come from the common belief that the midfield line lies exactly on the Equator - zero latitude - thus causing each team to defend one hemisphere. It is actually approximately 50 meters north of the equator, with the equator itself lying at the far southern end of the field.

Overview
The stadium has a maximum capacity of 10,000 people and was built in 1990. The name (and the fame) came from the circumstance that the stadium lies on the Equator - zero latitude. The midfield line is aligned with the nearby Marco Zero Monument, though it is about 2 seconds N in the World Geodetic System 84.

Zerão is owned by the Amapá State Government. The stadium is named after Milton de Souza Corrêa, who was a former president of the Amapá State Football Federation. The stadium is nicknamed after the neighborhood where it is located, Marco Zero (the neighborhood is named Marco Zero ("mark 0" in English) as it is located on the Equator). Zerão means Big Zero, denoting the zeroth latitude - Equator.

History
In 1990, the work on Zerão was completed. It was named Estádio Ayrton Senna, after the Formula 1 driver. The inaugural match was played on 17 October of that year, when Independente beat Trem 1–0. The first goal of the stadium was scored by Independente's Mirandinha. The stadium's attendance record currently stands at 10,000, set on that match.

In 1994, after Milton de Souza Corrêa's death, the stadium was renamed to its current name, Estádio Milton Corrêa.

The Zerão closed in 2007, and after seven years of remodeling, the stadium reopened in 2014.

References

Enciclopédia do Futebol Brasileiro, Volume 2 - Lance, Rio de Janeiro: Aretê Editorial S/A, 2001.

Football venues in Amapá
Multi-purpose stadiums in Brazil
Sports venues in Amapá
Equator monuments
1990 establishments in Brazil
Sports venues completed in 1990